Stephen Tyng Mather (July 4, 1867 – January 22, 1930) was an American industrialist and conservationist who was the first director of the National Park Service. As president and owner of Thorkildsen-Mather Borax Company he became a millionaire. With his friend the journalist Robert Sterling Yard, Mather led a publicity campaign to promote the creation of a unified federal agency to oversee National Parks administration, which was established in 1916. In 1917, Mather was appointed to lead the NPS, the new agency created within the Department of the Interior. He served until 1929, during which time Mather created a professional civil service organization, increased the numbers of parks and national monuments, and established systematic criteria for adding new properties to the federal system.

Early life
Stephen Tyng Mather was born July 4, 1867, in San Francisco, and named for the prominent Episcopal minister Stephen Tyng of New York, who was admired by his parents, Joseph W. Mather and Bertha Jemima Walker. Mather was educated at Boys' High School (now Lowell High School) in San Francisco, and graduated from the University of California at Berkeley in 1887.

His family moved to New York, where Mather worked as a reporter for the New York Sun until 1893. During that time he met and befriended Robert Sterling Yard, another reporter, who would become a close friend. In 1893 Mather married Jane Thacker Floy of Elizabeth, New Jersey, with Yard serving as his best man. They had one daughter, Bertha Floy Mather. In 1906, Mather became the sole owner of the Mather family homestead in Connecticut, which had been built by his great-grandfather about 1778. He and his family used it during the summers and he regarded it as his true home.

Business career
Mather started working for the Pacific Coast Borax Company at its headquarters in New York, where his father was administrator. Borax is a component of a variety of detergents and compounds, which was mined almost exclusively in California. Borax is a commodity, and as such, one brand is essentially as good as another. For a company to be successful, it had to mine the product more cheaply, process it more efficiently, or market it more aggressively. In 1894 the younger Mather moved with his wife to Chicago, where he established a distribution center for the company. In this role, he proved vital in advertising and sales promotion for the company. In particular he is credited with the idea of adding the label "20 Mule Team Borax" to the company's product, which subsequently became a household name throughout the country.

In 1898, Mather helped a friend, Thomas Thorkildsen, in starting another borax company. After suffering a severe episode of bipolar disorder in 1903 and having his salary withheld during extended sick leave, Mather resigned from Pacific Coast and joined Thorkildsen full-time in 1904.  They named their firm the Thorkildsen-Mather Borax Company. Their company became prosperous, and they were millionaires by 1914. This gave Mather the financial independence to pursue personal projects, and while in his mid-forties, he retired from the company to pursue those. Mather was active in many civic groups, including the Chicago City Club and Municipal Voter's League.

Conservation
Travel with his wife to Europe in 1904 renewed Mather's longtime interest in nature. Seeing the parks of Europe and their public accessibility, Mather was inspired to work to preserve more parkland in the US, to encourage new transportation methods to reach them, and to protect scenic resources and natural areas for the public good. He became a dedicated conservationist, and a friend and admirer of the influential John Muir.

In 1904, Mather joined the Sierra Club, and climbed Mount Rainier with some of its members the following year.  He was active in the group and made numerous allies who helped support the creation of the National Park Service. In 1916 the Sierra Club made him an honorary vice-president.

In 1915, Mather became a member of the Boone and Crockett Club, a conservation organization founded by Theodore Roosevelt and George Bird Grinnell in 1887.

There is the traditional story of how Mather came to Washington to run the National parks, which Horace Albright later said was wrong, though he had a part in keeping the story alive. Here's the traditional, if incorrect, story:
In 1914, Mather observed the deteriorating conditions in several National Parks, and wrote a letter of protest to Washington. Soon he received a reply from Secretary of the Interior Franklin K. Lane, a former classmate of Mather's from the University of California. Lane responded, "Dear Steve, If you don't like the way the parks are being run, come on down to Washington and run them yourself."

But in later years, Mather's assistant Horace Albright was to state:
In reality, they didn't know each other. Mather had graduated from the University of California with a Bachelor of Letters degree in 1887. Although registered in the class of 1889, Lane never did graduate. Adolph Miller, who knew both men quite well, graduated in Mather's class and affirmed that the two were not personally acquainted until 1914. 

Mather did go to Washington as assistant secretary of the Interior, and lobbied for the establishment of a bureau to operate the national parks. On August 25, 1916, President Woodrow Wilson signed the bill authorizing the National Park Service.  At the time, the government owned 14 parks and 19 national monuments, many administered by Army officers or political appointees, as battlefields were among the first parks designated. He used his personal funds to hire Robert Sterling Yard to work with him on publicizing the great resources of the parks.  Mather was effective in building support for the parks with a variety of politicians and wealthy corporate leaders. He also led efforts to publicize the National Parks and develop wider appreciation for their scenic beauty among the population. He appointed Yard as head of the National Park Education Committee to coordinate their various communication efforts. In April 1917, Mather was appointed as its first director, a position he filled until he resigned due to illness in January, 1929. During the course of his career, he and his staff molded the NPS into one of the most respected and prestigious arms of the federal government. Special credit is owing Horace M. Albright, another Sierra Club member, who served as assistant to Mather, and acting director during Mr. Mather's illnesses.

National Park Service
In 1916, the National Park Service was authorized by Congress and approved by President Wilson. Mather agreed to stay on, and with Albright, helped establish the new federal agency to protect and manage the national parks, together with a new appreciation for their wonders. In addition, he professionalized management of the parks, creating a cadre of career civil service people who were specialists in a variety of disciplines, to operate and manage the parks while preserving their natural character.

In 1917, Mather was appointed Assistant Secretary of Interior and head of the National Park Service. Due to his success in working with leaders of various groups and the Congress, he served until 1929.  He believed that magnificent scenery should be the first criterion in establishing a national park, and made efforts to have new parks established before the lands were developed for other purposes.

He introduced concessions to the national parks.  Among the services they sold were basic amenities and necessities to park visitors, plus aids for studying nature. Mather promoted the creation of the National Park to Park Highway. He also encouraged cooperation with the railroads to increase visitation to normally remote units of the National Park System.  He believed that once more of the public had visited the parks and enjoyed a comfortable stay in concessionaire facilities then they would become supporters for the fledgling agency and its holdings. By the time he left his position, the park system included 20 national parks and 32 national monuments. Mather also had created the criteria for identifying and adopting new parks and monuments.

Periodically disabled by bipolar disorder (manic-depression), Mather had to take some leaves from work and Albright continued in their mutual understanding of the task.  Over time they convinced Congress of the wisdom of extending the national park concept into the East, and in 1926 Shenandoah and Great Smoky Mountains national parks were authorized.  In January 1929 Mather suffered a stroke and had to leave office. He died a year later.

Legacy and memorials

 In 1928, Mather was awarded the first Cornelius Amory Pugsley Gold Medal Award
 In 1930, Mather was posthumously awarded the Public Welfare Medal from the National Academy of Sciences.
 In 1932, his family and friends established the Stephen Mather Memorial Fund, which commissioned numerous bronze plaques honoring Mather's accomplishments and installed them in national park units.
 In 1963, the Stephen Tyng Mather Home in Connecticut was declared a National Historic Landmark.
 Various places within today's National Park System are named after Mather, including:
Mather Point on the south rim of Grand Canyon National Park;
Mather District and Camp Mather in Yosemite National Park;
Mather Pass in Kings Canyon National Park;
Mather Gorge on the border of Great Falls Park and Chesapeake and Ohio Canal National Historical Park;
Mount Mather in Denali National Park;
Stephen T. Mather Training Center, which serves the entire National Park System and is located at Harpers Ferry National Historical Park in West Virginia.
 Other places were named in his honor:
Stephen Tyng Mather High School in Chicago, Illinois;
Stephen T. Mather Building Arts & Craftsmanship High School in New York City, NY;
Stephen Mather Memorial Parkway (Washington State Route 410) in the Mount Rainier National Park and the Mount Baker-Snoqualmie National Forest;
Stephen Mather Wilderness, comprising much of the North Cascades National Park.
Mather Lodge, a CCC-built log structure in Petit Jean State Park, Arkansas's first state park.

References

Further reading
 Everhart, William C.; The National Park Service; Praeger Publishers, New York, 1972
 Fox, Stephen; The American Conservation Movement: John Muir and His Legacy University of Wisconsin Press, 1986, 
 Shankland, Robert; Steve Mather of the National Parks; Alfred A. Knopf, New York; 1970

External links

 William Swift, "Stephen T. Mather 1867–1930" , National Park Service: The First 75 Years, NPS
 "Guide to the Stephen Tyng Mather Papers", The Bancroft Library
 

1867 births
1930 deaths
Businesspeople from San Francisco
Lowell High School (San Francisco) alumni
People from Brookline, Massachusetts
Directors of the National Park Service